Sébastien Bonmalais (born 6 February 1998 in Saint-Pierre, Reunion Island) is a French professional squash player. As of August 2018, he was ranked number 100 in the world. He won the 2017 Gibraltar Open and the 2017 Guatemala Open.

References

1998 births
Living people
French male squash players
20th-century French people